Jaahnavi Sriperambuduru is an Indian mountaineer and motivational speaker. She is on her mission to climb the highest peaks of all seven continents known as the Seven Summits and also to reach the farthest point on the globe "The South Pole" and "The North Pole".

She is on her pursuit for the Grand Slam to become the youngest Girl in the World in her Phase I climbs.

Early life

Jaahnavi started her wilderness career at a very tender age of 10 months only, along with her parents Dr. S. Krishna Rao (Father) and Mrs. S. Saraswathi (Mother). By the age 3 years, she used to accompany her father in different Treks and Expeditions along with other children. By the age of 10 years, she had completed nearly 2 High Altitude Treks, 5 National Treks, and around 25 Local Treks.

She is also a Bharatanatyam dancer and also a painter.

Climbing career

Earlier, on 2 October 2014, Jaahnavi reached the summit of Mount Kilimanjaro (5,895 m), the highest mountain in Africa.

She also became the youngest Indian to climb the highest peak of Australia - Mount Kosciuszko (2,228 m). She also completed the Aussie 10 Challenge in 4 days, by climbing all the 10 highest peaks of Snowy mountains.

In February 2016, she created yet another unique record, by becoming the youngest Mount Everest Base Camp trek guide. She accomplished this assignment by guiding a 10 years old girl and her mother after training them both for nearly 3 months with the help of her coach Nagapuri Ramesh and her Father Dr. S. Krishna Rao.

Her another accomplishment is North America's highest peak Mount Denali (also known as Mount McKinley) in the month of July 2016 along which she also became the first Indian born Telugu girl to be invited to the White House to take part in National South Asian Symposium wherein she got an opportunity to interact with the high officials of the First Lady's office and the President.

In 2017 she had another feather to her list as she trained and guided the largest contingent of school students of 28 students aged from 7 years to 16 years to Everest Base Camp and became a global record

On the auspicious day of Janmashtami 2018, she made yet another unique record by summiting a virgin peak in Stok range of the Himalayas in the north-west region of India. She is awaiting documentation from the agency.

Mission7Summit climbs 

These are part of Jaahnavi's #Mission7Summit, through which she wants to climb the tallest peaks of every continent so as to raise funds to educate the underprivileged girls in India.

Other notable climbs

Motivation 

Apart from her regular mountaineering passion, Jaahnavi works for the development of girl child in India. She wants to raise funds from her climbing and educate underprivileged girls and train them with life skills. Her ultimate dream is to make each and every girl child of India tough and educate them through her NGO under the name JanJay Foundation.

Jaahnavi is also a Motivational Speaker and gives the talk and inspires not only youth but also adults and takes part in different symposiums and discussions. She goes around villages and suburbs to educate girls and also gives talks in schools, colleges and different organisations including MNC's.

She also became the youngest speaker for the TEDxHyderabad 2016 and was also the special invitee speaker for TEDxBVRIT. 

On 3 November 2017, she was the youngest speaker in TEDxDSCEWomen in Bangalore.

She gives commercials related to girl empowerment and sends messages for girl stereotypes for gender equality.

Her recent campaign #AmPrettyTough through one of the leading cosmetic company of India, Dabur Gulabari, has brought about a major change in the thought process of "Don't judge a book by its cover". In this campaign, Jaahnavi was shown as a girly girl.
 She takes parts in different activities to promote her Mission and spread the Word #AmPrettyTough breaking the gender equality.

She also organizes different outdoor activities along with trekking & hiking for kids & girls under her banner JanJay Adventures. Till now she has organized many activities to develop the confidence among the girls and move ahead.

Speaking assignments 

 Youth Symposium in The White House - USA
 TEDx Hyderabad Youngest Speaker - Hyderabad
 TEDx WomenDSCE - Bangalore
 TEDx Bocconi - Mumbai
 TEDx BVrit - Hyderabad
 Gender Equality - IIM Indore
 Key Note Speaker - Toastmasters District 92, semi-Annual Meet - Bangalore
 Key Note Speaker - IWN Telanga Annual Day

Achievements and awards 

 TV 9 Naveena Mahila Awards - Young Achiever of the Year - 2015
 Rotary International Vocational Award - 2015
 Youngest Speaker of TEDxHyderabad -  2016
 MegaTV National Awards - Young Achiever of the Year - 2016

See also 
 Mountaineering in India
 Seven Summits

External links 
 www.jaahnavi.com

References

Living people
Indian female mountain climbers
2001 births
21st-century Indian women
21st-century Indian people